Tanandava (also Antanandava) is a rural municipality in Madagascar. It belongs to the district of Bekily, which is a part of Androy Region. The population of the commune was estimated to be approximately 7,000 in 2001 commune census.

Only primary schooling is available. The majority 99.99% of the population of the commune are farmers.  The most important crops are rice and peanuts; also cassava is an important agricultural product. Services provide employment for 0.01% of the population.

References 

Populated places in Androy